Jarmo Mäkinen (born 29 May 1958 in Karstula, Finland) is a Finnish actor.

Mäkinen began acting in 1989 on television working consistently throughout the 1990s appearing in several films and TV series mostly notably in Vita lögner which he starred in 27 episodes in 1999. However, since 2000 he has gradually made more appearances on the big screen and in film he starred in the 2003 film Sibelius working with Finnish director Timo Koivusalo and actors such as Martti Suosalo, Heikki Nousiainen, Seela Sella, Miina Turunen and Vesa Vierikko.

Most of Mäkinen's work in cinema has been in Swedish film where his powerful physical build has often seen him typecast as a bad guy. He is often regarded as one of the most famous or most popular Finns in Sweden.

Filmography

Film 

 Amor ampuu ohi (1990) - Tapani
 Routasydän (1993) - Vanhanen
 Paratiisin lapset (1994) - Athlete
 The Last Wedding (1995) - The Rockroller
 The Hunters (1996) - Tomme Harela
 The Jackal (1997) - Ghazzi's Bodyguard (uncredited)
 Zingo (1998) - Puda
 Poika ja ilves (1998) - Herman Haapala
 Lapin kullan kimallus (1997) - Edvard Manninen
 Dykaren (2000) - Charlie
 Ponterosa (2001) - Rantaruotsalainen
 Young Love (2001) - Miss Young Face-kisojen juontaja
 Ancient Warriors (2002) - Hank
 Sibelius (2003) - Akseli Gallen-Kallela
 At Point Blank (2003) - Raimo
 Populärmusik från Vittula (2004) - Isak / Niila's father
 Rancid (2004) - Ash
 Den utvalde (2005) - Bodström
 Babas bilar (2006) - Penti
 Quest for a Heart (2007) - Paksu Rölli (voice)
 Myrsky (2008) - Rehtori
 Kommissarie Späck (2010) - Enhörningen
 The Path of the Righteous Men (2012) - Juhana Sulander
 Purge (2012) - Lavrenti
 Vadelmavenepakolainen (2014) - Jorma
 The Girl King (2015) - The General
 LasseMajas detektivbyrå - Stella Nostra (2015) - Pandoro
 The Dissidents (2017) - Finnish Investigator
 Operation Ragnarök (2018) - Sampo / Boss Monster
 The Longest Day (2020)

TV 
 Tatort (2009, Episode: "Tango für Borowski", Crime Scene, German crime television series)

References

External links

Finnish male film actors
People from Karstula
1958 births
Living people
Finnish expatriates in Sweden